The categories for television, at the Inaugural Australian Academy of Cinema and Television Arts Awards, known commonly as the AACTA Awards, were presented by the Australian Academy of Cinema and Television Arts (AACTA). The awards were presented with the film awards on two separate events: the AACTA Awards Luncheon, on 15 January 2012, at the Westin Hotel, and the AACTA Awards Ceremony, on 31 January 2012, at the Sydney Opera House. Public voted awards were also be presented for Best Television Series, Best Actor and Best Actress.

Nominees

Winners will be listed first and highlighted in boldface.

Academy voted awards

Public voted awards

See also
 2011 AACTA Film Awards
 Logie Awards of 2012
 AACTA Awards
 2011 in Australian television

References

External links
 The Australian Academy of Cinema and Television Arts

Television
AACTA Television Awards
AACTA Television Awards